Wado Siman (born Eduardo Tan Siman; June 22, 1988) is a Filipino chef, entrepreneur, entertainment producer, screenwriter, motivational speaker, and television personality in the Philippines. He owns the Wadoughs Cafe at Sikatuna Village in Quezon City, Philippines.

Personal life
Siman finished high school in 2006 at the Sacred Heart College in Lucena City, Quezon Province and finished his undergraduate in communication at the University of Santo Tomas in 2010. Siman was a student leader in the University of Santo Tomas and was active with extra-curricular, being president of the now reorganized Tomasian Cable Television and an actor for university theatre guild Teatro Tomasino.

Wadoughs 
Siman started Wadoughs as an online business in 2012, while he is producing and writing for television. He joined food bazaars and weekend markets to sell his creations and became a finalist in a reality television show The Clash: Search for the Next Great Dessert Master. From then, Siman bagged the grand prize for Globe Pitch Tuesdays’ search for the next big food entrepreneur.

Minimalist Cakes
Due to the COVID-19 lockdown in the Philippines, more people have been further exposed to Korean content on streaming television and music platforms. With the trends of the dalgona coffee and baked samgyup coming to the Philippines, the minimalist cakes were also hyped online. Wadoughs trended over social media by posting minimalist cakes with captions relating to Filipino sentiments during the lockdown.

Television credits

References 

Living people
University of Santo Tomas alumni
1988 births